Lesbian, gay, bisexual, and transgender (LGBT) persons in the Cook Islands face legal challenges not experienced by non-LGBT residents. Homosexuality is illegal for men in the Cook Islands (but the law is not enforced), though female homosexual acts are legal. Same-sex marriage is outlawed. Nevertheless, LGBT people do enjoy some limited legal protections, as employment discrimination on the basis of sexual orientation has been banned since 2013.

Homosexual relations and transgender people have been part of Cook Islander culture for centuries. Historically, transgender people (nowadays called akava'ine; literally to behave like a woman) were seen as an important part of the family and the local tribe. The arrival of foreign Christian missionaries quickly changed societal acceptance, and the first anti-gay laws in the Cook Islands were enacted thereafter. The only LGBT advocacy group in the Cook Islands is the Te Tiare Association. The group officially launched in June 2008, and encourages debates on the issue and has organised events with the aim of raising awareness of the lives of LGBT people.

History
The Cook Islands, much like the rest of Polynesia, used to be tolerant of same-sex relationships and transgender people before the arrival of Christianity.

The colloquial term for men who act like women is laelae. Culturally, laelae are different from gay or transgender people. The term refers to a wide range of people, as it does throughout Polynesia, some of whom may identify as female but are biologically men, as both male and female, or as neither. Laelae engage in women's work, such as cooking, cleaning and sewing, tend to socialise with women and tend to wear female clothing, but have little desire to have sex with other laelae. They typically have sex with heterosexual men, who not consider themselves, nor are they considered by others, to be "homosexual". Nowadays, there exists a relative tolerance and acceptance of laelae in terms of their public behaviour (their cross-dressing and dance performances are regarded with fascination by both men and women), but a near complete avoidance of laelae sexuality as a topic of discussion. Dr. Kalissa Alexeyeff, of the University of Melbourne, states that the introduction of Western understandings of sexuality and gender has resulted in laelae sexuality being taboo. Laelae who are caught engaging in homosexual relations are often beaten up by male family members.

Since the 2000s, the Māori word akava'ine has come to refer to transgender people from the Cook Islands.

Laws regarding same-sex sexual activity

Crimes Act 1969
Male homosexual activity is illegal in the Cook Islands. Consensual male sodomy is punishable by up to seven years' imprisonment, while indecency between males is punishable by up to five years' imprisonment. The law was inherited by the former British Empire. Prosecutions have been rare, however.

Section 154. Indecency between males
(1) Every one is liable to imprisonment for a term not exceeding five years who, being a male,
(a) Indecently assaults any other male; or
(b) Does any indecent act with or upon any other male; or
(c) Induces or permits any other male to do any indecent act with or upon him.
(2) No boy under the age of fifteen years shall be charged with committing or being a party to an offence against paragraph (b) or paragraph (c) of subsection (1) of this section, unless the other male was under the age of twenty-one years.
(3) It is not defence to a charge under this section that the other party consented.

Section 155. Sodomy
(1) Every one who commits sodomy is liable
(a) Where the act of sodomy is committed on a female, to imprisonment for a term not exceeding fourteen years;
(b) Where the act of sodomy is committed on a male, and at the time of the act that male is under the age of fifteen years and the offender is of over the age of twenty-one years, to imprisonment for a term not exceeding fourteen years;
(c) In any other case, to imprisonment for a term not exceeding seven years.
(2) This offence is complete upon penetration.
(3) Where sodomy is committed on any person under the age of fifteen years he shall not be charged with being a party to that offence, but he may be charged with being a party to an offence against section 154 of this Act in say case to which that section is applicable.
(4) It is no defence to a charge under this section that the other party consented.

Section 159. Keeping Place of resort for homosexual acts
Every one is liable to imprisonment for a term not exceeding ten years who-
(a) Keeps or manages, or acts or assists in the management of, say premises used as a place of resort for the commission of indecent acts between males; or
(b) Being the tenant, lessee, or occupier of any promises, knowingly permits the premises or any part thereof to be used as a place of resort for the commission of indecent acts between males; or
(c) Being the lessor or landlord of any premises, or the agent of the lessor or landlord, lets the premises or any part thereof with the knowledge that the premises are to be used as a place of resort for the commission of indecent acts between males, or that dome part thereof is to be so used, or is wilfully a party to the continued use of the premises or any part thereof as a place of resort for the commission of such acts as aforesaid.

Sections 152 and 153 of the Criminal Code set the age of consent for vaginal intercourse at 16. Lesbian sex is not mentioned at all in local laws, as was the case in the laws of the former British Empire.

Crimes Bill 2017
Announced in August 2017, the draft Crimes Bill 2017 would decriminalise same-sex sexual activity between men. Public submissions to the parliamentary committee examining the bill began on 9 August. Due to the June 2018 general elections, public consultations on the bill were put on hold. However, following opposition from churches, a committee reinstated the ban on 5 November 2019 and inserted a clause extending the ban to women. In response, the Democratic Party called for a review, stating that the reinsertion of the clauses "breach[es] the United Nations Declaration of Human Rights ... and the nation's own Constitution". The Cook Islands Tourism Industry Council has expressed concerns the bill could negatively affect the islands' tourism industry.

The bill has received the support of Marie Pa Ariki, an influential tribal chief, who has called the anti-gay law "unfair". Conversely, the Religious Advisory Council has expressed concerns of foreign "pressure" to abandon "Christian principles", which led to calls of irony as Christianity itself is a foreign addition to Cook Islander culture.

Parliament was set to debate the bill in September 2020, however, media and news came out that several Cook Islands bills had been "deferred" to 2021 within the committee stage - due to COVID-19.

In 2022, the debate was again postponed to March 2023.

Recognition of same-sex relationships
Same-sex marriage was outlawed by the Marriage Amendment Act 2000. The law was clarified in 2007 to state that "no person shall be permitted to marry another person who is of the same gender as him or herself," and to legislatively define the gender of transsexuals. On 28 April 2013, Prime Minister Henry Puna expressed his personal opposition to the legalisation of same-sex marriage. The Registrar of the High Court has the power to void and dissolve marriages that violate the law.

Civil unions are not recognised either (though both civil marriage and civil unions by same-sex couples are recognised and performed in New Zealand).

Discrimination protections
Discrimination on the basis of "sexual preference" is prohibited in employment, according to Section 55(e) of the Employment Relations Act 2012, which entered into force on 1 July 2013.

Section 10(g) of the Cook Islands Disability Act 2008 prohibits discrimination against disabled persons based on their sexual orientation.

Statistics
2016 data from the United Nations Development Programme estimated that there were between 500 and 800 men who have sex with men and transgender people in the Cook Islands, of whom 40% reported feeling ashamed about their identity and 30% felt low self-esteem. All reported having had sexual intercourse, and 22% reported having had both male and female sexual partners in the last 12 months.

The Cook Islands News reported in late 2019 that a survey from the University of the South Pacific showed that, of 674 Cook Islands college students, 9.1% identified as LGBT, and 22.7% "refused or were unsure about" which categories to put themselves into.

Living conditions
The Cook Islands Christian Church is the largest religion on the islands, with more than half of the population claiming an affiliation to it. The Congregationalist church believes that homosexuality and cross-dressing are signs of immorality and this impacts both public attitudes as well as government policy. The Cook Islands LGBT community feels the need to be discreet and travel advisories also urge visitors to be discreet and not to engage in public displays of affection. The travel website cookislands.org.uk reports that homosexuality is generally accepted and a laissez-faire attitude is taken to tourists, though public displays of affection may offend.

Summary table

See also

Human rights in the Cook Islands
LGBT rights in New Zealand
LGBT rights in Oceania

References

External links
 

Politics of the Cook Islands
Cook Islands law